Ponjesly College of Engineering (PJCE) is an engineering college located at Alamparai, 5 km from Nagercoil,  Near Parvathipuram, Tamil Nadu, India. It was established in 2004. The total build–up-area of college is around 6 lakh sq.feet.

External links
 

Private engineering colleges in Tamil Nadu
Colleges affiliated to Anna University
Universities and colleges in Kanyakumari district
Educational institutions established in 2004
2004 establishments in Tamil Nadu